A fiduciary trust is a fiduciary  relationship in which a trustee holds the title to assets for the beneficiary. The trust's creator is called the grantor and a fiduciary trust is structured under trust law.

One usage of the term "fiduciary trust" is to distinguish the word "trust" from usage in general contexts where it does not imply a trustee-beneficiary relationship, and also sometimes to distinguish it from implied trusts (such as some constructive trusts and some resulting trusts) in which the trustee does not have express intent of a major fiduciary duty involving nontrivial discretion on the part of the trustee.

References

External links
 Definition by Trading-Glossary.com

Wills and trusts